Lafayette Square may refer to several places in the United States:

Lafayette Square, Los Angeles, Mid-Wilshire neighborhood of Los Angeles, California
Lafayette Square (Savannah, Georgia), one of Savannah's 22 city squares
Lafayette Square Mall, Indianapolis, Indiana
Lafayette Square (New Orleans), in the Central Business District, New Orleans, Louisiana
Lafayette Square (Baltimore), Maryland
Lafayette Square, Cambridge, part of the Central Square area of Cambridge, Massachusetts
Lafayette Square, St. Louis, a neighborhood in St. Louis, Missouri
Lafayette Square Historic District (St. Louis)
Lafayette Square (Buffalo), New York State
Lafayette Square station
Lafayette Square, Washington, D.C., northernmost part of President's Park 
Lafayette Square Historic District, Washington, D.C., near the White House